Tim Jo (born April 20, 1984) is an American television and film actor, he is most famous for playing "Reggie Jackson" on the ABC comedy, The Neighbors.

Early life and education 
Jo was born in Dallas in 1984. As a child, he appeared as a model in catalogues and acted in television commercials. He studied computer science at Trinity University before switching his major to drama and communications, graduating in 2006.

Career
Jo made his debut in The 2 Bobs in 2009, a few weeks later, he was cast in Bandslam. He joined a band after the release of the movie along with other actors, Ryan Donowho and Sarah Roemer called Animals of Kin. In 2010, he was cast in two episodes of Greek. He was later cast in a lead role in TBS, Glory Daze playing Alex Chang. In 2011, he appeared on an episode of Castle. In December 2011, he was cast in a Dan Fogelman pilot, The Neighbors. His character name in the pilot was "Joe Montana" but it was changed to "Reggie Jackson" before filming.

Filmography

Film

Television

References

External links

1984 births
Living people
American male film actors
American male television actors
Male actors from Dallas
21st-century American male actors
Trinity University (Texas) alumni